Fighting Youth is a 1935 American drama film directed by Hamilton MacFadden and written by Henry Johnson, Hamilton MacFadden and newspaper reporter Florabel Muir. The film stars Charles Farrell, June Martel, Andy Devine, J. Farrell MacDonald, Ann Sheridan and Edward Nugent. The film was released on November 1, 1935, by Universal Pictures.

Plot
A radical campus group persuades student Carol Arlington to lead a protest of a college's football team. She manages to recruit Larry Davis, even though he is a star player for State's team.

Larry needs money to marry sweetheart Betty Wilson, but needs a job. Carol and the committee protest that the school is using its athletes to make a profit. A distracted Larry fumbles in the next game and is kicked off the team by Coach Parker, who is offended by Larry's campus activities.

With some asserting that Larry lost the game on purpose, a campus radical, Tony Tonetti, turns out to be an undercover agent investigating troublemakers trying to infiltrate the campus and influence the students. Larry is left out of the big season-ending game until the very end, when Parker has a change of heart, lets him play and ends up victorious.

Cast  
Charles Farrell as Larry Davis
June Martel as Betty Wilson
Andy Devine as Cy Kipp
J. Farrell MacDonald as Coach Parker
Ann Sheridan as Carol Arlington
Edward Nugent as Anthony Tonnetti 
Herman Bing as Luigi
Phyllis Fraser as Dodo Gates
Stephen Chase as Louis Markoff
Jim Purvis as Football Player from Purdue
Paul Schwegler as Football Player from University of Washington
Leslie Cooper as Football Player from Minnesota
Howard Christie as Cadet Christie from University of California
Frank Sully as Football Player from St. Louis
Glen Boles as Paul 
Murray Kinnell as Dean James Churchill
David Worth as Football Captain Blake
Jeff Cravath as Assistant Coach
Charles C. Wilson as Bull Stevens 
Walter Johnson as Buck
Jean Rogers as Blonde Student
Clara Kimball Young as Mrs. Stewart
Ralph Brooks as Football Player
Robert Hale as Student 
Dell Henderson as Detective
Russell Wade as Buck's Roommate
John 'Dusty' King as Singing Band Leader

References

External links 
 

1935 films
American drama films
1935 drama films
Universal Pictures films
Films directed by Hamilton MacFadden
American black-and-white films
1930s English-language films
1930s American films
English-language drama films